The Ravenelle Painter, also known as  the Master of the Book of Hours of Johannete Ravenelle, the Ravenelle Master or the First Master of the Bible Historiale of Jean de Berry, was a French manuscript illuminator active between 1390 and 1405.  Little is known about him. In a 2002 dissertation, Eva Lindqvist Sandgren used stylistic comparison to identify this artist as the illuminator of a book of hours now in the Uppsala University Library, the Ravenelle Hours (MS C 517e). This identification is now widely accepted (for example, by the Bibliothèque nationale de France and the British Library). An earlier notname for the same artist derives from a manuscript of the Bible Historiale, now held by the Bibliothèque nationale de France in Paris, in which he painted several miniatures.  The manuscript was once owned by John, Duke of Berry, and with most books containing other work ascribed to the artist seems to have been produced in Paris.  This would indicate that the artist lived and worked there, producing large secular works as well as religious treatises written in vernacular French.

Works 
The body of work attributed to this master was first defined by Millard Meiss from his contribution to a manuscript of the Bible historiale intended for John, Duke of Berry, his most famous manuscript even though his participation is limited. This manuscript was made in collaboration with the Master of the Coronation of the Virgin who takes a much larger and more original part. Eva Lindqvist Sandgren's work expanded a proposed corpus to include many works made in Paris around the turn of the 15th century, both individual works and works made in partnership with other illuminators.

Sources

References

External links

Publicly accessible digitised works by the Ravenelle Painter
Digitised version of Brussels, KBR ms 9091 (Letters to Lucillus by Seneca in French)
Digitised version of London, BL Add MS 25884 (Histoire ancienne jusqu’à César)
Digitised version of London, BL Add MS 38120 (Pèlerinages by Guillaume de Deguileville)
Digitised version of London, BL Add MS 89309 (Southwark Hours)
Digitised version of Paris, BN fr. 159 (Bible historiale)
Digitised version of Paris, BN fr. 184 (La Légende dorée by Jacques de Voragine)
Digitised version of Paris, BN fr. 829 (Pèlerinages by Guillaume de Deguileville)
Digitised version of Uppsala, UUB C 517 e (Ravenelle Hours)

14th-century births
15th-century deaths
14th-century French painters
Manuscript illuminators
Bible Historiale of Jean de Berry, First Master of the